Csaba Giczy (born 5 August 1945) is a Hungarian sprint canoer who competed from the late 1960s to the late 1970s. Competing in two Summer Olympics, he won two medals at Mexico City in 1968 with a silver in the K-2 1000 m and a bronze in the K-4 1000 m events.

Giczy also won eight medals at the ICF Canoe Sprint World Championships with three golds (K-1 4 x 500 m: 1971, K-4 1000 m: 1973, K-4 10000 m: 1973), three silvers (K-4 10000 m: 1971, 1974, 1977), and two bronzes (K-4 1000 m: 1970, 1974).

References

External links
 
 

1945 births
Canoeists at the 1968 Summer Olympics
Canoeists at the 1976 Summer Olympics
Hungarian male canoeists
Living people
Olympic canoeists of Hungary
Olympic silver medalists for Hungary
Olympic bronze medalists for Hungary
Olympic medalists in canoeing
ICF Canoe Sprint World Championships medalists in kayak
Medalists at the 1968 Summer Olympics
20th-century Hungarian people